Mary Dresselhuys (January 22, 1907 – May 19, 2004) was a Dutch stage actress, although she appeared in a few movies as well. She was born in Tiel, the Netherlands, and died in Amsterdam.

Mary Dresselhuys played more than 150 roles during her long career. She played a wide range of roles, but got most known as the Queen of Comedy. She performed till high age. After she turned 80, she asked Paul Haenen to write a play (Een bijzonder prettig vergezicht) in which she and her daughter Petra played. At the age of 85 she played a part in the movie Eline Vere, and at 90, she was on stage again, where she, together with Paul Haenen, looked back at her career.

Early years
Mary played her first parts while she was still a gymnasium student. She spent her vacations with her grandmother in The Hague, where she grabbed every opportunity to go to the theatre{snd} getting a front row seat if possible. In her teen years, she managed to see about 200 plays{snd} keeping notes about the plays and actors she saw in a notebook, which she kept throughout her life.  After high school, she spend half a year in an English boarding school after which she took an entering exam for the Toneelschool (acting school) in Amsterdam, without her parents knowledge. She passed the exam. After her graduation in 1929, Mary played her first part, in the play Men trouwt geen meisjes zonder geld (One Doesn't Marry Girls Without Money). From 1931 till 1945, she played with the company Centraal Tooneel. She appeared on stage in Wie is Janus? (Who is Janus?)), a translation of Carolyn Green's play Janus, in 1958.

Among the films in which she appeared are:

De Kribbebijter (1935) .... Mary
Dorp aan de rivier (1958) .... Mrs. Van Taeke
Vroeger kon je lachen (1983) .... Vrouw op station
Eline Vere (1991) .... Mevrouw van Raat

References

External links

 

1907 births
2004 deaths
Dutch film actresses
Dutch stage actresses
People from Tiel
20th-century Dutch actresses
21st-century Dutch actresses